Nosratollah Momtahen (23 October 1930 – 19 October 2013) was an Iranian sports shooter. He competed in the 50 metre pistol event at the 1964 Summer Olympics.

References

1930 births
2013 deaths
Iranian male sport shooters
Olympic shooters of Iran
Shooters at the 1964 Summer Olympics
Place of birth missing